Bear Cove, Nova Scotia may be the following communities in Nova Scotia:

Bear Cove, Digby, Nova Scotia
Bear Cove, Halifax, Nova Scotia